Barnett Glacier is a large glacier in the Anare Mountains that flows east along the south side of Tapsell Foreland into Smith Inlet, northern Victoria Land, Antarctica. It was mapped by the United States Geological Survey (USGS) from surveys and from U.S. Navy air photos, 1960–63, and named by the Advisory Committee on Antarctic Names after Donald C. Barnett, USGS topographic engineer, a member of USGS Topo East and West, 1962–63, in which the expedition extended geodetic control from the area of Cape Hallett to the Wilson Hills (Topo West) and from the foot of Beardmore Glacier through the Horlick Mountains (Topo East). The glacier lies on the Pennell Coast, a portion of Antarctica lying between Cape Williams and Cape Adare.

See also
 List of glaciers in the Antarctic
 Glaciology

References
 

Glaciers of Pennell Coast